Jeanne Dugas (October 16, 1731 October 1817) was an Acadian woman whose life exemplified the history of the Acadian people in the Canadian Maritimes.

Early life
The daughter of Joseph Dugas, a ship builder and navigator, and Marguerite Richard, she was born in Louisbourg. During the smallpox epidemic of 1732 to 1733, she lost three sisters and her father. Her mother, who took over the management of her husband's affairs, married Philippe-Charles de Saint-Étienne de La Tour in 1736. Around 1738, the family moved to Grand-Pré. Dugas' mother died in 1746.

Adult life
At the end of the War of the Austrian Succession, Île-Royale (later Cape Breton Island), was returned to France. By 1752, Dugas had married Pierre Bois and was living at Port-Toulouse. The couple had moved to Restigouche in Acadia by 1760; in 1761, they were in Népisiguit. Later that year, they were taken prisoner by the British and brought to Fort Cumberland. The prisoners were released at the end of the Seven Years' War and, in 1771, Dugas and her family were living at Arichat. By 1784, the couple had moved to Cascapédia near the current town of New Richmond. Soon afterwards, they became one of the founding families of Chéticamp, Nova Scotia. Dugas was the village midwife; in that role, she probably also looked after the sick of the village.

Later life
By 1809, her husband had died. When Bishop Joseph-Octave Plessis visited Chéticamp in 1812, Dugas told him of how she had been forced to relocate fifteen times over her life. She was buried at Chéticamp on October 16, 1817 at the age of 86.

Her brother Joseph was a merchant and privateer who remained loyal to France.

Recognition
In 2013, Cassie Deveaux Cohoon published the biographical novel Jeanne Dugas of Acadia. A play was also written based on her life.

In 2014, Jeanne Dugas was named a Person of National Historic Significance by the Canadian government.

References 

1731 births
1817 deaths
Acadian people
Persons of National Historic Significance (Canada)
People from the Cape Breton Regional Municipality
People from Inverness County, Nova Scotia
Canadian midwives